Penally railway station serves the village of Penally in Pembrokeshire, Wales. It is on the Pembroke Dock branch of the West Wales Line operated by Transport for Wales.

History
Penally station was closed on 15 June 1964, then reopened temporarily during the summers of 1970 and 1971 before being permanently open from 28 February 1972.

Facilities
Step-free access is provided from both station car parks to the platform. The station is unstaffed and only has basic amenities: waiting shelter, timetable information posters and digital CIS displays to offer train running information in real time.

Services
There are a pair of through trains to Cardiff each weekday, though late evening services terminate at Carmarthen. There are four trains each way on Sundays. The Summer Saturday GWR service also calls here once a day in both directions.

References

External links 

Railway stations in Pembrokeshire
DfT Category F2 stations
Former Great Western Railway stations
Railway stations in Great Britain opened in 1863
Railway stations in Great Britain closed in 1964
Railway stations in Great Britain opened in 1970
Railway stations in Great Britain closed in 1970
Railway stations in Great Britain opened in 1971
Railway stations in Great Britain closed in 1971
Railway stations in Great Britain opened in 1972
Reopened railway stations in Great Britain
Beeching closures in Wales
Railway stations served by Great Western Railway
Railway stations served by Transport for Wales Rail
Railway request stops in Great Britain